Statistics of the American Soccer League II for the 1969 season.

League standings

ASL All-Stars

Playoffs

Bracket

Northern Division playoff

Championship final

First leg

Second leg

1969 ASL Champions: Washington Darts (4-0 aggregate)

Season awards
Most Valuable Player: Jim Lefkos, Syracuse
Coach of the Year: Lincoln Phillips, Washington
Manager of the Year: Walter Bahr, Philadelphia Spartans
Rookie of the Year: Bob DiLuca, Rochester
Most Improved Player: Jerry Kliveka, Philadelphia Spartans

References

American Soccer League II (RSSSF)

American Soccer League (1933–1983) seasons
2